Oenopota diabula is a species of sea snail, a marine gastropod mollusk in the family Mangeliidae.

Description
The length of the shell varies between 4 mm and 5 mm.

Distribution
This marine species occurs in the Atlantic Ocean off the Campos Basin, southeast Brazil.

References

 Figueira, R.M.A. & Absalão R.S. (2010) Deep-water Drilliinae, Cochlespirinae and Oenopotinae (Mollusca, Gastropoda, Turridae) from the Campos Basin, southeast Brazil. Scientia Marina 74(3): 471–481

External links
 

diabula
Gastropods described in 2010